KDVV (100.3 FM) is a radio station broadcasting an album-oriented rock format. Licensed to Topeka, Kansas, United States, the station serves the Topeka area. The station is currently owned by Cumulus Media and features programming from United Stations Radio Networks and Westwood One.

History
KDVV was Topeka's dominant Top 40/CHR station shortly right after KDVV's call letters were introduced. The format continued throughout the 1980s and into the early 1990s.

The station has aired various forms of rock music since the 1990s, at times leaning heavily on classic rock and at other times playing more new music. In 2014, V100 became the Topeka affiliate of the Bob & Tom Show. V100 serves now as the de facto active rock station for Topeka, Junction City, and Manhattan since the nearest active rock station provides only rimshot coverage.

References

External links
KDVV official website

DVV
Album-oriented rock radio stations in the United States
Radio stations established in 1985
1985 establishments in Kansas
Cumulus Media radio stations